Santo Niño (Binukid: Kabegén) is a rural barangay in the Basakan District of Malaybalay, Bukidnon, Philippines. According to the 2015 census, it has a population of 1,675 people. It is bordered to the north by Simaya and San Martin, to the east by Sinanglanan and Apo Macote, to the south by Nabag-o of the City of Valencia, and to the west by Bangcud and Mailag.

It is an agricultural village where rice is a major product. It was formerly known as Cabugon or Kabegén which means a place of fruit bats and was converted into a barangay in 1986 by virtue of Republic Act no. 3590.

References 

Barangays of Malaybalay